Sack of Budapest may refer to:

 the devastation of Hungary after the 1241 Battle of Mohi against the Mongols
 the pillage of Buda by the Ottoman army after the 1526 Battle of Mohács
 the invasion of Hungary by the Soviet army following the Hungarian Revolution of 1956